Dr. William C. Hetzel is an expert in the field of software testing.  He compiled the papers from the 1972 Computer Program Test Methods Symposium, also known as the Chapel Hill Symposium, into the book Program Test Methods. The book, published in 1973, details the problems of software validation and testing.

The International Conference and Exposition on Testing Computer Software, which is the first conference with a focus on software testing, is convened in 1984 by the US Professional Development Institute (USPDI) in Washington, D.C.  Hetzel and Dr. David Gelperin are the joint program chairs.

Hetzel and Dave Gelperin co-found the Software Quality Engineering consultancy firm in 1986.  Their motto was, "Test, then code."  Together they worked to establish software testing as a stand-alone computer discipline.  In 1988 they classified the phases and goals of software testing into the following stages:

 Until 1956 – Debugging Oriented – Until 1956 it was the debugging oriented period, when testing was often associated to debugging: there was no clear difference between testing and debugging.
 1957–1978 – Demonstration Oriented – From 1957–1978 there was the demonstration oriented period where debugging and testing was distinguished now – in this period it was shown, that software satisfies the requirements.
 1979–1982 – Destruction Oriented – The time between 1979–1982 is announced as the destruction oriented period, where the goal was to find errors.
 1983–1987 – Evaluation Oriented – The years 1983–1987 are classified as the evaluation oriented period: intention here is that during the software lifecycle a product evaluation is provided and measuring quality.
 1988– – Prevention Oriented – From 1988 on it was seen as prevention oriented period where tests were to demonstrate that software satisfies its specification, to detect faults and to prevent faults.

In 1988 Gelperin and Heztel write the article The Growth of Software Testing.  In it they discuss four major models for software testing.  The first two are Phase Models, and the second two are Life Cycle Models.

 Demonstration – To make sure that software satisfies its specification
 Destruction – To detect implementation faults
 Evaluation – To detect requirements, design, and implementation faults
 Prevention – To prevent requirements, design, and implementation faults

Hetzel's book The Complete Guide to Software Testing which provides methodologies, testing techniques, and the principles of software testing, is released in 1988.  The book is released in a 2nd edition later the same year, and several other printings are made through 1994.

In 1992 Gelperin and Hetzel firm organized the first "Software Testing, Analysis & Review," the "STAR" conference, in Las Vegas, Nevada and in 1993 introduced a European equivalent, the EuroSTAR Conference. The US-based conferences are now produced by TechWell Corporation which is the new name for their Software Quality Engineering company.

Gelperin and Hetzel developed the STEP methodology for implementing the original IEEE-829-1998 Standard for Software and System Test Documentation. Their firm was instrumental in gaining recognition for testing as a separate discipline within the software industry.

References

Software testing people
Living people
Year of birth missing (living people)